Sphenostylis stenocarpa or the African yam bean is a species of plant in the Fabaceae which is native to Africa. It is an important source of food in many parts of Africa. The tubers are fried, boiled or roasted, and are higher than the seeds in protein.

References

External links

Phaseoleae